Acrossocheilus lamus is a species of ray-finned fish in the family Cyprinidae. It is endemic to Vietnam and only known from the Cả River (=Lam River).

References

Lamus
Freshwater fish of Asia
Fish of Vietnam
Endemic fauna of Vietnam
Fish described in 1978